{{DISPLAYTITLE:C20H26N4O}}
The molecular formula C20H26N4O (molar mass: 338.45 g/mol, exact mass: 338.2107 u) may refer to:

 Lisuride

Molecular formulas